Pleotomus is a genus of fireflies in the family Lampyridae. There are about five described species in Pleotomus.

Species
These five species belong to the genus Pleotomus:
 Pleotomus cerinus Zaragoza, 2002
 Pleotomus davisii LeConte, 1881
 Pleotomus emmiltos Zaragoza, 2002
 Pleotomus nigripennis LeConte, 1885
 Pleotomus pallens LeConte, 1866

References

Further reading

 
 
 
 
 
 

Lampyridae
Bioluminescent insects